Amblyseius multidentatus is a species of mite in the family Phytoseiidae.

References

multidentatus
Articles created by Qbugbot
Animals described in 1959